Carl Friedrich Wilhelm Wehmer (20 September 1858 Freiburg, Kingdom of Hanover - 11 January 1935 Hannover, Germany), was a German chemist and mycologist. He worked on the production of citric acid by fermentation.

References

19th-century German chemists
1858 births
1935 deaths
20th-century German chemists